The Bambatha Rebellion (or the Zulu Rebellion) of 1906 was led by Bambatha kaMancinza (c. 1860–1906?), leader of the Zondi clan of the Zulu people, who lived in the Mpanza Valley (now a district near Greytown, KwaZulu-Natal) against British rule and taxation in the Colony of Natal, South Africa.

Overview 

In the years following the Anglo-Boer War, British employers in Natal had difficulty recruiting Black farm workers because of increased competition from the gold mines of the Witwatersrand. The colonial authorities introduced a poll tax £1 in addition to the existing hut tax to pressure Zulu men to enter the labour market.

Bambatha had occasionally been in trouble with the Natal colonial administration, and the authorities suspected that he had joined with other chiefs in expressing discontent over the tax. He was summoned to Greytown, but, fearing arrest, did not attend. He realised that the administration was intent on crushing dissent and fled to Zululand to consult with King Dinizulu.
Bambatha returned to the Mpanza Valley to discover that the Natal government had deposed him as chief. He gathered together a small force of supporters and began launching a series of guerrilla attacks, using the Nkandla forest as a base.

The British troops succeeded in getting face to face with and surrounding the rebels at Mome Gorge. As the sun rose, British colonial soldiers opened fire with machine guns and cannon, on rebels equipped mostly assegais (spears), knobkerries (fighting sticks) and cowhide shields. It was reported that Bambatha had been killed in action by Natal government forces, but this claim was disputed by his supporters, who believed that he fled to Mozambique.

Between 3,000 and 4,000 Zulus were killed. More than 7,000 were imprisoned, and 4,000 flogged. The war cost the Natal government £883,576.

Mahatma Gandhi's role

Indian lawyer Mohandas Karamchand Gandhi, who was in South Africa at the time, felt that the Indians in South Africa would do best for themselves to serve the British Empire as a reserve force in the Army against the Zulus during the rebellion. Gandhi actively encouraged the British government to recruit Indians. He argued that Indians should support the war efforts in order to legitimise their claims to full citizenship. The British government, however, refused to allow Indians to enlist as combatants. Nonetheless, they accepted Gandhi's offer to let a detachment of Indians volunteer as a stretcher bearer corps to treat wounded Zulu soldiers. This corps of 21 was commanded by Gandhi. Gandhi urged the Indian population in South Africa to join the war through his columns in Indian Opinion: "If the Government only realised what reserve force is being wasted, they would make use of it and give Indians the opportunity of a thorough training for actual warfare". Later in 1927 he wrote of the event as "No war but a man hunt".

Commemoration
In 2006, the hundredth anniversary of the rebellion was commemorated in a ceremony which declared Chief Bambatha a national hero of post-Apartheid South Africa. Also, his picture appeared on a postage stamp and a street was renamed in his honour.

According to speeches in the ceremony, the beheaded body had not really been Bambatha's and the actual chief succeeded in escaping to Mozambique. This belief is still widely current; a DNA test of his alleged body failed to give a definite answer.

The hip-hop musician Afrika Bambaataa takes his name from Bambatha and his rebellion.

See also
 First Boer War (1880–1881)
 Natal Native Rebellion Medal (1907)

References

Citations

Sources

Further reading

1906 in the Colony of Natal
20th-century rebellions
African resistance to colonialism
Conflicts in 1906
Rebellions in Africa
Zulu history